B.L. Blanchard (Chippewa) is an American fiction writer.

She graduated from University of California, Davis , and Boston University School of Law.

Works 

 The Peacekeeper, 47North, 2022.

References

External links 
 https://blblanchard.com/

21st-century American novelists
Year of birth missing (living people)
Living people
Place of birth missing (living people)
American women novelists
University of California, Davis alumni
Boston University School of Law alumni